Van Diemen's Land is a 2009 Australian thriller set in 1822 in colonial Tasmania. It follows the story of the infamous Irish convict, Alexander Pearce, played by Oscar Redding and his escape with seven other convicts. The voice-over and some of the dialogue is in Irish.

Plot

The film takes place in 1822 in Tasmania and is loosely based on a true story. A group of transported convicts, suffering brutal treatment at the Sarah Island penal settlement on Van Diemens Land, as Tasmania was then known (until 1856) escape into the wilderness in hopes of reaching the settlements to the east. Their enthusiasm and bravado soon give way to hunger, which saps their strength and causes them to despair. Former urban dwellers, the English, Irish and Scottish convicts realise that not only are they lost, but they do not even know how to hunt or fish. Hunger and despair forces the group to switch to cannibalism, and the band is separated by a difference in opinion on this. Some of the group members separate from the group and walk to their imminent death. The men do all in their power to keep moving, watch their back and avoid sleep, lest they be the next meal. The film ends with only one survivor, Alexander Pearce.

Convicts

 Alexander Pearce – Aged 32, Irish, thief
 Robert Greenhill – 32, English, sailor
 Matthew Travers – 27, Irish, farmer
 Alexander Dalton – 25, Irish, ex-soldier
 John Mather – 24, Scottish, bread baker
 Thomas Bodenham – 22, English, thief
 William Kennerly – 44, Irish, thief
 Edward 'Little' Brown – 48, English, profession unknown

Cast

Release and reception

Van Diemen's Land was released in Australian cinemas on 24 September 2009, and was rated MA15+ for "strong violence and coarse language". It received mostly positive reviews, and earned an 80% approval rating on Rotten Tomatoes based on 10 reviews with an average 6.6/10 rating. During the opening weekend, the film grossed $39,939 at the 9 theatres it played ($4,438 average). 

The film won 2 awards in 2009: Sitges - Catalonian International Film Festival(New Visions Award - Special Mention) and Torino Film Festival award for Best Script - Special Mention.

Box office
Van Diemen's Land grossed $289,858 at the box office in Australia.

See also
 Cinema of Australia
 Dying Breed
 The Last Confession of Alexander Pearce
 Tasmanian Gothic

References

External links
 
 Van Diemen's Land at Rotten Tomatoes
 Official Site

2009 films
Australian epic films
Australian horror thriller films
2000s horror thriller films
2009 horror films
Films shot in Australia
Films set in colonial Australia
2009 psychological thriller films
Films set in Tasmania
Films about cannibalism
Films set in 1822
Films about prison escapes
2000s English-language films